Diamond Nights is a hard rock/indie rock band whose influences include Thin Lizzy, Queen, and Cheap Trick. They formed in New York City in 2003, and released their debut album Popsicle in 2005. The band's song "The Girl's Attractive" was featured in a 2006 Jaguar advertisement, as well as the episode entitled "Thirst" from The CW's Smallville and in an Austrian beer (Stiegl) commercial.

Band members
 Morgan Phalen - Vocals, guitar
 Rob Laakso - Guitar, synthesizers
 Seth Rumsey - Bass
 Tim Traynor - Drums

Discography
So Fantastic (Limited Vinyl EP) (2004)
Once We Were Diamonds (EP) (2005)
''Popsicle (2005)

External links
 The Future of Rock 'n' Roll - Rob Fanclub

Hard rock musical groups from New York (state)
Musical groups established in 2003
Musical groups from New York City